Gürkan Ekren (born 2 August 1974) is a Turkish professional footballer who plays as a goalkeeper.

References

1974 births
Living people
Turkish footballers
Bucaspor footballers
Manisaspor footballers
İzmirspor footballers
Eskişehirspor footballers
Tokatspor footballers
Kütahyaspor footballers
Akhisarspor footballers
Altay S.K. footballers
Association football goalkeepers
People from Soma, Manisa
Sportspeople from Manisa